John Olov Güttke (30 March 1931 – 18 December 2007) was a Swedish biathlete. He competed in the 20 km event at the 1964 Winter Olympics and finished ninth.

References

1931 births
2007 deaths
Biathletes at the 1964 Winter Olympics
Olympic biathletes of Sweden
Swedish male biathletes
20th-century Swedish people